International competitions in 3D archery take place every two years.

Championships

Champions

Men

Women

Mixed

Notes

References

See also
 World Archery Championships

 
3D